Dan Taylor (8 March 1922 – 13 May 2005) was  a former Australian rules footballer who played with Footscray in the Victorian Football League (VFL).

References

External links 
 		
 

1922 births
2005 deaths
Australian rules footballers from Victoria (Australia)
Western Bulldogs players